Wacht am Rhein is a grand tactical monster board wargame published by Simulations Publications, Inc. (SPI) in 1977 that simulates Germany's Battle of the Bulge offensive in late 1944 during World War II.

Description  
In December 1944, in an operation codenamed "Wacht am Rhein" ("Watch on the Rhine"), the German army tried to break through the lightly guarded Ardennes Forest sector in an attempt to drive a wedge through the Allied armies, take the port of Antwerp and force a separate negotiated peace with the British, French and American allies. Wacht am Rhein is a simulation of that conflict, a grand tactical two-player wargame set at the battalion and company level. With 1400 counters, it is considered a "monster" wargame.

Components
The game was packaged in either a clear plastic flat box that incorporated counter trays, or a standard cardboard bookshelf game box. Both boxes included:
 Four  hex grid paper maps scaled to 1 mile (1.6 km) per hex
 1600 double-sided  die-cut counters
 Rulebook
 Two Game Charts and Tables sheets
 Axis Turn Record/Reinforcement Track and an Allied Turn Record/Reinforcement Track 
 Six-sided die

Scenarios
Two smaller scenarios use limited counters and only one of the four maps, and are designed to allow the players to learn the rules.
 "Bastogne"
 "Kampfgrüppe Peiper"

Two larger scenarios use all four maps joined together into a 44" x 68" master map representing the entire front of the U.S. V and VII Corps, and use all 1400 counters.
 "December 21 – The Race for the Meuse": Play begins at the historic point where the German forces reached their furthest penetration.
 "Campaign": Covers the entire battle from December 16, 1944 to January 2, 1945.

Gameplay
Each day is divided into a morning turn representing 4 hours, an afternoon turn representing 4 hours, and an evening turn representing 15 hours.

At the start of each morning turn the Allied player randomly determines the weather conditions for the day, and both players allocate their air missions for the day. Both players also check to see if any of their isolated units have surrendered.

During each turn, the Allied player acts first:
Mutual Supply Determination Phase
Movement Phase 
Bridge Blowing and Bridge Building Phase
Combat Phase
Once the Allied player is finished, the German player gets the same phases.

Once both players have completed their turn, there is a Mutual Fatigue Reduction phase.

At the end of each night game turn, but before the start of the next day, each player — the Allied player first and then the German player — may choose to take a Night Bonus Game Turn. Any units that move during this Bonus Turn have a chance to be "fatigued" the next day, halving their movement and attack factors until they recover; and any units that are involved in night combat are always fatigued the next day until they recover.

There are also several optional rules that can be used with the agreement of both players, including new artillery rules, engineer rules for the German forces, and morale rules.

Publication history
SPI had previously published two small board wargames about the "Battle of the Bulge": The Ardennes Offensive (1973), and Bastogne: The Desperate Defense (1976). Wacht am Rhein, considerably larger and more complex than either of its predecessors, was designed by Jim Dunnigan, with cartography and artwork by Redmond Simonsen, and was published by SPI in 1977. Several errors and ambiguities in the rules and set up were discovered after the game's release, and SPI published a set of errata in Fire & Movement #8.

Wacht am Rhein was not a bestsller for SPI. Although the game was #2 in SPI sales in April 1977, it fell to 10th place only two months later, and permanently disappeared off SPI's Top 10 list by the end of the summer. When TSR took over SPI in 1983 and sought to get an immediate return on its money by re-printing a number of SPI titles, Wacht am Rhein was not included.

Reception
In Issue 40 of Moves, Jim Govostes liked some of the innovative rules such as the  Night Bonus Game Turn, and overall found the scenarios to be balanced, and the effects of the terrain and limited roads equally as frustrating for both players. Govostes thought that leader counters should have been included, as they were in SPI's Highway to the Reich (1977), pointing out that "There were several prominent men who affected the outcome of the battle." Despite some quibbles about various rules, Govostes concluded with a strong recommendation, saying, "I heartily and highly recommend Wacht am Rhein. While there are flaws, they are small. The guts of the game system is a thing to behold. The game can take one from the very heights of euphoria to the depths of utter frustration easily. It is one of my choices for SPI's best."

In his 1977 book The Comprehensive Guide to Board Wargaming, Nick Palmer called this "a real feast for the expert, ghastly for beginners."

In the 1980 book,  The Best of Board Wargaming , Marcus Watney gave an extended review of the game and found several issues that detracted from it: "The Truppeneinheit (German commando) units are far too powerful, being able to divert entire divisions turn after turn; too many small artillery units bog down play and detract from an otherwise swiftly moving game; and the US activation rules are open to the most appalling abuses." Watney concluded by giving the game an "Excitement" grade of 70%, saying, "Nevertheless, this is basically a sound game, and very entertaining when there are a large number of players."

In The Guide to Simulations/Games for Education and Training, Martin Campion called this "an excellent game for history and playability and gives the feel of real tactics though its rules. It is a very complex and long game but it is worth the time spent playing it." Campion did not think this would be a usable teaching aid, saying, "Because of its size and length it is not well suited to school use."

In the 1980 book The Complete Book of Wargames, game designer Jon Freeman called this "perhaps the ultimate simulation of the Battle of the Bulge, long a favorite gaming topic. The wealth of detail reduces the playability of the game, but you don't purchase a game of this physical immensity for playability anyway, and the illusion of reality created is intense." Freeman concluded by giving the game an Overall Evaluation of "Very Good", although he noted the game was "for hard-core enthusiasts only [...] For true Bulge enthusiasts it will provide endless hours of engrossing and educational conflict."

The website SPI Wargame Resources believes that Wacht am Rhein "has stood the test of time to become one of the top 5 monster games in history."

Awards
At the 1978 Origins Awards, Wacht am Rhein was a finalist for a Charles S. Roberts Award in the category "Best Tactical Game of 1977".

Other reviews
 Moves #46 
 Strategy & Tactics #71 
 Strategy & Tactics #78
 Fire & Movement #18, #20, and #65The Wargamer Vol.1 #33,  and Vol.2 #17Campaign #92 and #95The Grenadier #27Zone of Control #4Paper Wars #21Simulacrum #20 and #21Simulations Canada Newsletter #13Wargame News #42Games & Puzzles'' #73

References

Board games introduced in 1977
Jim Dunnigan games
Simulations Publications games
Wargames introduced in 1977
World War II board wargames